Randall Norton Christmas (October 14, 1920 – July 27, 1969) was the Mayor of Miami from 1955 to 1957. He had previously served on the Miami City Commission from 1953 to 1955.

In 1926 the Christmas family relocated to Miami. The sixth of seven siblings, Randall began working as a young boy delivering the Miami Herald. He attended Edison High School where he graduated in 1938. Christmas served with the US Marine Corps VMB443 in a B-25 bomber in the Pacific Theater during World War II where he met and became acquainted with George Smathers, later to become an influential Senator from the state of Florida. As a student at the University of Miami in 1948, he became a charter member of the Beta Delta chapter of Phi Kappa Tau fraternity.  In 1951, Randall graduated from the University of Miami School of Law. Christmas served in a time of tremendous change and phenomenal growth for Miami highlighted by the creation and transition to Miami-Dade, a municipal entity incorporating the whole of Miami proper with several of the smaller municipalities in the wider metro area. Christmas was the first mayor to serve from what are still the current offices of the City of Miami municipal government. He can be seen on camera from these offices at the start of the movie Miami Exposé (1956) which Christmas introduces to audiences. He later served as an Assistant State's Attorney from 1960 to 1964, afterwards continuing in private practice till his death.

Merrie Christmas Park in the Coconut Grove neighborhood of Miami is named for Christmas' daughter, Merrie, who died at the age of 15 in 1969.

He is buried at Southern Memorial Cemetery in North Miami Beach, Florida.

References

External links

1920 births
1969 deaths
University of Miami School of Law alumni
Mayors of Miami
20th-century American politicians